The 2013 Central Arkansas Bears football team represented the University of Central Arkansas in the 2013 NCAA Division I FCS football season. The Bears were led by 14th-year head coach Clint Conque and played their home games at Estes Stadium. They were a member of the Southland Conference.

Media
All Central Arkansas games can be listened to on KHLR 106.7 FM and are streamed online through the station's website.

Schedule

Game summaries

Incarnate Word

Sources:Box Score

Colorado

Sources:Box Score

UT Martin

Sources:

Missouri State

Sources:

McNeese State

Sources:

Nebraska–Kearney

Sources:

Lamar

Sources:

Stephen F. Austin

Sources:

Northwestern State

Sources:

Southeastern Louisiana

Sources:

Nicholls State

Sources:

Sam Houston State

Sources:

Ranking movements

References

Central Arkansas
Central Arkansas Bears football seasons
Central Arkansas Bears football